The Westland is a magazine mainly devoted to historic railway operations in Western Australia, with items relating to current operations included. It is based in Perth.

History
The Westlands earliest form was with the title Westland Express.  Between 1973 and 1984 it was known as The Westlander.

The new title, The Westland, was utilised in January 1985.  

The magazine is published by Rail Heritage WA, the Western Australian branch of the Australian Railway Historical Society.
From February 2008, it began to be published quarterly. As of June 2012, 270 editions had been published.

It derives its name from The Westland, the overnight passenger service between Kalgoorlie and Perth on the Western Australian Government Railways that operated between 1938 and 1969.

Some magazine issues also commemorate special anniversaries of specific railway lines/services, as well as those relating to the organization.

It occasionally includes reviews of books and media related to railways.

References

1985 establishments in Australia
Rail transport magazines published in Australia
Magazines established in 1985
Quarterly magazines published in Australia
Rail transport in Western Australia
Magazines published in Perth, Western Australia